Literature of the 20th century refers to world literature produced during the 20th century (1901 to 2000).

In terms of the Euro-American tradition, the main periods are captured in the bipartite division, Modernist literature and Postmodern literature, flowering from roughly 1900 to 1940 and 1960 to 1990 respectively, divided, as a rule of thumb, by  World War II. The somewhat malleable term "contemporary literature" is usually applied with a post-1960 cut off point.

Although these terms (modern, contemporary and postmodern) are most applicable to Western literary history, the rise of the globalization has allowed European literary ideas to spread into cultures other than European fairly rapidly, so that the diversity of Asian and African literatures can be included into these divisions. And in some ways, such as in Postcolonial literature, writers were on the forefront of literary development.

Technological advances during the 20th century allowed cheaper production of books, resulting in a significant rise in production of popular literature and trivial literature, comparable to the similar developments in music. The division of "popular literature" and "high literature" in the 20th century is by no means absolute, and various genres such as detectives or science fiction fluctuate between the two.  Largely ignored by mainstream literary criticism for the most of the century, these genres developed their own establishments and critical awards; these include the Nebula Award (since 1965), the British Fantasy Award (since 1971) or the Mythopoeic Awards (since 1971).

Towards the end of the 20th century, electronic literature developed due to the development of hypertext and later the World Wide Web.

The Nobel Prize in Literature was awarded annually throughout the century (with the exception of 1914, 1918, 1935 and 1940–1943), the first laureate (1901) being Sully Prudhomme. The New York Times Best Seller list has been published since 1942.

The best-selling literary works of the 20th century are estimated to be The Lord of the Rings (1954/55, 150 million copies), Le Petit Prince (The Little Prince, 1943, 140 million copies), Harry Potter and the Philosopher's Stone (1997, 120 million copies) and And Then There Were None (1939, 115 million copies). 
The Lord of the Rings was also voted "book of the century" in various surveys.
Perry Rhodan (1961 to present) proclaimed as the best-selling book series, with an estimated total of 1 billion copies sold.

1901–1918

The Fin de siècle movement of the Belle Époque persisted into the 20th century, but was brutally cut short with the outbreak of World War I (an effect depicted e.g. in Thomas Mann's The Magic Mountain, published 1924). The Dada movement of 1916-1920 was at least in part  a protest against the bourgeois nationalist and colonialist interests which many Dadaists believed were the root cause of the war; the movement heralded the Surrealism movement of the 1920s.

1900
 Lord Jim by Joseph Conrad (Poland, England)
 The Knights of the Cross by Henryk Sienkiewicz (Poland)
Genre fiction
 The Wonderful Wizard of Oz by L. Frank Baum (US)

1901
 Buddenbrooks by Thomas Mann (Germany)
 The Inheritors by Joseph Conrad and Ford Madox Ford (England)
 Kim by Rudyard Kipling (India, England)
Genre fiction
 The Purple Cloud by M. P. Shiel (Montserrat, England)
 The First Men in the Moon by H. G. Wells (England)

1902
 Heart of Darkness by Joseph Conrad 
 The Immoralist by André Gide (France)
 The Wings of the Dove by Henry James (US, England)
 The Grand Babylon Hotel by Arnold Bennett (England)
Genre fiction
 The Hound of the Baskervilles by Arthur Conan Doyle (Scotland)
 Just So Stories by Rudyard Kipling
Plays
 Man and Superman by George Bernard Shaw (Ireland)

1903
 Romance by Joseph Conrad and Ford Madox Ford
 The Ambassadors by Henry James
 The Pit by Frank Norris (US)
 In Wonderland by Knut Hamsun (Norway)
Genre fiction
 The Call of the Wild by Jack London (US)
 The Riddle of the Sands by Erskine Childers (England, Ireland)

1904
 The Golden Bowl by Henry James
 Nostromo by Joseph Conrad
 The Napoleon of Notting Hill by G. K. Chesterton (England)
 The Peasants by Władysław Reymont (Poland)
Genre fiction
 The Food of the Gods by H. G. Wells
 The Sea-Wolf by Jack London
 Green Mansions by William Henry Hudson (Argentina, England)
Plays
 John Bull's Other Island by George Bernard Shaw

1905
 Hadrian the Seventh by Frederick Rolfe aka Baron Corvo (England, Italy)
 Where Angels Fear to Tread by E. M. Forster (England)
 Kipps by H. G. Wells
 Songs of Life and Hope by Rubén Darío (Nicaragua)
 The House of Mirth by Edith Wharton (US)
 The Club of Queer Trades by G. K. Chesterton

1906
 The Jungle by Upton Sinclair (US)
 The Confusions of Young Törless by Robert Musil (Austria)
Genre fiction
 Puck of Pook's Hill by Rudyard Kipling
 Peter Pan in Kensington Gardens by J. M. Barrie (Scotland)
 Time and the Gods by Lord Dunsany (Ireland, England)
 White Fang by Jack London
Plays
 The Aran Islands by John Millington Synge (Ireland)
 The Morality of Mrs. Dulska by Gabriela Zapolska (Poland)

1907
 The Secret Agent by Joseph Conrad
 The Longest Journey by E. M. Forster
Genre fiction
 The Listener and Other Stories by Algernon Blackwood (England) - contains The Willows, one of the first 'cosmic horror' stories
 The Hill of Dreams by Arthur Machen (England)
Plays
 The Playboy of the Western World by John Millington Synge
Poetry
 Cautionary Tales for Children by Hilaire Belloc (France, England)

1908
 The Man Who Was Thursday by G. K. Chesterton
 A Room with a View by E. M. Forster
 The Iron Heel by Jack London
 Hell by Henri Barbusse (France, Russia)
 The Magician by Somerset Maugham (England, France) - based on the author's meeting with Aleister Crowley
Genre fiction
 The Wind in the Willows by Kenneth Grahame (England)
Poetry
 Personae by Ezra Pound (US, England, Italy) - one of the first examples of 'modernist' poetry

1909
 Martin Eden by Jack London
 Sparrows: the story of an unprotected girl by Horace W C Newte
 Tono-Bungay by H. G. Wells
 Three Lives by Gertrude Stein (US, France)
Poetry
 Exultations by Ezra Pound
 Poems by William Carlos Williams (US)
Plays
 The Blue Bird by Maurice Maeterlinck (Belgium)

1910
 Howards End by E. M. Forster
 The Card by Arnold Bennett
 The History of Mr Polly by H. G. Wells

1911
 Zuleika Dobson by Max Beerbohm (England)
 In a German Pension by Katherine Mansfield (England) - short stories
 Under Western Eyes by Joseph Conrad
 The White Peacock by D. H. Lawrence (England)
 Jennie Gerhardt by Theodore Dreiser (US)
In Desert and Wilderness by Henryk Sienkiewicz (Poland)
Genre fiction
 Peter and Wendy by J. M. Barrie (Scotland)

1912
 The Trespasser by D. H. Lawrence
 Death in Venice by Thomas Mann (Germany)
Genre fiction
 Riders of the Purple Sage by Zane Grey (US)
 The Lost World by Arthur Conan Doyle
 Tarzan of the Apes by Edgar Rice Burroughs (US)
Plays
 Pygmalion by George Bernard Shaw

1913
 Petersburg by Andrei Bely (Russia)
 Swann's Way by Marcel Proust (France)
 Le Grand Meaulnes by Alain-Fournier (France)
 Sons and Lovers by D. H. Lawrence
 Chance by Joseph Conrad
Genre fiction
 A Prisoner in Fairyland by Algernon Blackwood - adapted into a play, it later became the Andrew Lloyd Webber musical Starlight Express
 The Mystery of Dr. Fu-Manchu by 'Sax Rohmer' (England)
Poetry
 Alcools by Guillaume Apollinaire (Poland, France) - dada poems
 Gitanjali by Rabindranath Tagore

1914
 Dubliners by James Joyce (Ireland, France, Italy) - short stories
 The Prussian Officer and Other Stories by D. H. Lawrence - short stories
 The Vatican Cellars by André Gide
 Tender Buttons by Gertrude Stein
 The Golem by Gustav Meyrink (Austria)
 Mist by Miguel de Unamuno (Spain)
 Maurice by E. M. Forster - unpublished
 Sinister Street by Compton Mackenzie (Scotland, Greece)
 The Flying Inn by G. K. Chesterton
The Ragged-Trousered Philanthropists by Robert Noonan (UK)
Poetry
 North of Boston by Robert Frost (US)

1915
 The Good Soldier by Ford Madox Ford
 The Rainbow by D. H. Lawrence
 The Metamorphosis by Franz Kafka
 Of Human Bondage by Somerset Maugham
 The Underdogs by Mariano Azuela (Mexico)
 Victory by Joseph Conrad
 Pointed Roofs by Dorothy Richardson
 The Voyage Out by Virginia Woolf (England)
 Vainglory by Ronald Firbank (England)
 Rashōmon by Ryūnosuke Akutagawa
Genre fiction
 The Thirty-Nine Steps by John Buchan (Scotland, Canada)

1916
 A Portrait of the Artist as a Young Man by James Joyce
 Women in Love by D. H. Lawrence - initially banned, published in 1920
Genre fiction
 Greenmantle by John Buchan
Poetry
 Salt-Water Poems and Ballads by John Masefield (England)
 Mountain Interval by Robert Frost

1917
 Under Fire by Henri Barbusse (France, Russia)
 Walpurgis Night by Gustav Meyrink
 Growth of the Soil by Knut Hamsun
 The Shadow Line by Joseph Conrad
 Caprice by Ronald Firbank
Poetry
 Dulce et Decorum est and Anthem for Doomed Youth by Wilfred Owen (England) - published posthumously
 Prufrock and Other Observations by T. S. Eliot (US, England)

1918
 Tarr by Wyndham Lewis (Canada, England)
 Man of Straw by Heinrich Mann (Germany)
Poetry
 Calligrammes by Guillaume Apollinaire - dada poetry
Non-fiction
 Eminent Victorians by Lytton Strachey (England)

Interwar period

The 1920s were a period of literary creativity, and works of several notable authors appeared during the period. D. H. Lawrence's novel Lady Chatterley's Lover was a scandal at the time because of its explicit descriptions of sex. James Joyce's novel, Ulysses, published in 1922 in Paris, was one of the most important achievements of literary modernism.

1919
 Within a Budding Grove by Marcel Proust
 Night and Day by Virginia Woolf
 Winesburg, Ohio by Sherwood Anderson (US) - the first 'lost generation' novel
 Valmouth by Ronald Firbank
 Bazaar-e-Husn by Premchand (publ. in Hindi as Seva-sadan)
Genre fiction
 Dope by Sax Rohmer - inspired by the true story of Limehouse dope-dealer Brilliant Chang
 Dope Darling by Leda Burke (David Garnett) (England)

1920
 We by Yevgeny Zamyatin (Russia)
 Limbo by Aldous Huxley (England) - short stories
 The Lost Girl by D. H. Lawrence
 This Side of Paradise by F. Scott Fitzgerald (US)
 The London Venture by Michael Arlen (Armenia, England)
 Storm of Steel by Ernst Jünger (Germany)
 A Voyage to Arcturus by David Lindsay (Scotland)
 Main Street by Sinclair Lewis (US)
 The Age of Innocence by Edith Wharton (US)
Plays
 Six Characters in Search of an Author by Luigi Pirandello (Italy)
 Beyond the Horizon and Anna Christie by Eugene O'Neill - Pulitzer prize winner

1921
 The Guermantes Way by Marcel Proust
 Crome Yellow by Aldous Huxley
 England, My England and Other Stories by D. H. Lawrence - short stories
 The Forsyte Saga by John Galsworthy (England) - pentalogy, first volume published in 1906
 My Life and Loves by Frank Harris (England, US) - four volumes of quasi-factual sex gossip, the fifth completed by Alex Trocchi
Plays
 Back to Methuselah by George Bernard Shaw
 R.U.R. (Rossum's Universal Robots) by Karel Čapek - from which the term 'robot' was coined

1922
 Ulysses by James Joyce
 Jacob's Room by Virginia Woolf
 Sodom and Gomorrah by Marcel Proust
 Croatian God Mars by Miroslav Krleža
 The Enormous Room by E. E. Cummings (US)
 Futility by William Gerhardie (Russia, England)
 The Beautiful and Damned by F. Scott Fitzgerald
 Mortal Coils by Aldous Huxley - short stories
 Aaron's Rod by D. H. Lawrence Kim
 The Garden Party by Katherine Mansfield - short stories
 Siddhartha by Hermann Hesse (Germany, Switzerland)
 Peter Whiffle by Carl Van Vechten (US)
 Babbitt by Sinclair Lewis
 Lady into Fox by David Garnett
Poetry
 The Waste Land by T. S. Eliot

1923
 Confessions of Zeno by Italo Svevo (Italy)
 The Good Soldier Švejk by Jaroslav Hašek (Czechoslovakia)
 The Captive by Marcel Proust
 Kangaroo by D. H. Lawrence
 Antic Hay by Aldous Huxley
 Three Soldiers by John Dos Passos (US)
 The Great American Novel by William Carlos Williams
 The Devil in the Flesh by Raymond Radiguet (France)
 Aelita by Alexey Tolstoy (Russia)
Plays
 The Shadow of a Gunman by Seán O'Casey (Ireland)
Poetry
 New Hampshire by Robert Frost
 The Duino Elegies by Rainer Maria Rilke

1924
 The Magic Mountain by Thomas Mann (Germany)
 In Our Time by Ernest Hemingway (US) - short stories
 A Passage to India by E. M. Forster
 The Vortex by José Eustasio Rivera (Colombia)
 Little Mexican by Aldous Huxley - short stories
 Bohemian Lights by Ramón del Valle-Inclán (Spain)
 The Fox and The Captain's Doll by D. H. Lawrence - short stories
Miranda by Antoni Lange (Poland)
Riddles and Conundrums for All Occasions

Genre fiction
 The Murder of Roger Ackroyd by Agatha Christie (England)
Plays
 Juno and the Paycock by Seán O'Casey
 The Vortex by Noël Coward (England)

1925
 Mrs Dalloway by Virginia Woolf
 The Trial by Franz Kafka (Czechoslovakia) - posthumous, first English translation in 1930
 The Great Gatsby by F. Scott Fitzgerald - often described as the epitome of the "Jazz Age" in American literature
 The Green Hat by Michael Arlen - perhaps the epitome of the jazz age in British literature
 Paris Peasant by Louis Aragon (France)
 Albertine disparue by Marcel Proust
 Manhattan Transfer by John Dos Passos
 In the American Grain by William Carlos Williams
 The Desert of Love by François Mauriac (France)
 Gentlemen Prefer Blondes by Anita Loos (US)
 Those Barren Leaves by Aldous Huxley
 St Mawr by D. H. Lawrence - short stories
 The Making of Americans by Gertrude Stein
 Heart of a Dog by Mikhail Bulgakov (Russia)
Genre fiction
 Beau Geste by P. C. Wren (England)
Poetry
 The Hollow Men by T. S. Eliot
Non-fiction
 The Old Straight Track by Alfred Watkins (England) - introducing ley lines

1926
 The Castle by Franz Kafka - posthumous, first English translation in 1932
 The Counterfeiters by André Gide
 The Sun Also Rises aka Fiesta by Ernest Hemingway
 Moravagine by Blaise Cendrars (France)
 Don Segundo Sombra by Ricardo Güiraldes (Argentina)
 Nigger Heaven by Carl Van Vechten
 Two or Three Graces by Aldous Huxley - short stories
 The Plumed Serpent by D. H. Lawrence
 The Call of Cthulhu by H. P. Lovecraft
Genre fiction
 Winnie-the-Pooh by A. A. Milne (England)
Poetry
 A Drunk Man Looks at the Thistle by 'Hugh MacDiarmid' (Scotland)
Plays
 The Plough and the Stars by Seán O'Casey
Non-fiction
 Seven Pillars of Wisdom by T. E. Lawrence (England, Arabia)

1927
 To the Lighthouse by Virginia Woolf
 Time Regained by Marcel Proust
 Steppenwolf by Hermann Hesse
 Men Without Women by Ernest Hemingway - short stories
 Vestal Fire by Compton Mackenzie
 Dusty Answer by Rosamond Lehmann (England)
 Elmer Gantry by Sinclair Lewis
 The Rocking-Horse Winner by D. H. Lawrence - short stories
Plays
 The Silver Tassie by Seán O'Casey

1928
 Berlin Alexanderplatz by Alfred Döblin (Germany)
 Nadja by André Breton (France)
 Story of the Eye by Georges Bataille (France)
 Parade's End by Ford Madox Ford - war tetralogy, first volume in 1926
 Gypsy Ballads by Federico García Lorca
 Point Counter Point by Aldous Huxley
 Lady Chatterley's Lover by D. H. Lawrence - banned until 1963
 Decline and Fall by Evelyn Waugh (England)
 Amerika by Franz Kafka - posthumous, first English translation in 1938
Plays
 Strange Interlude by Eugene O'Neill (US) - Pulitzer prize winner
 Messrs. Glembay by Miroslav Krleža
Non-fiction
 All Quiet on the Western Front by Erich Maria Remarque (Germany) - recounts the horrors of World War I and also the deep detachment from German civilian life felt by many men returning from the front

1929
 Les Enfants Terribles by Jean Cocteau (France)
 A Farewell to Arms by Ernest Hemingway (US)
 Look Homeward, Angel by Thomas Wolfe
 Death of a Hero by Richard Aldington (England)
 The Sound and the Fury by William Faulkner (US)
 Doña Bárbara by Rómulo Gallegos (Venezuela)
 Mario and the Magician by Thomas Mann (Germany)
 The Escaped Cock by D. H. Lawrence (England)
 The Defence by Vladimir Nabokov (Russia, France)
  Wolf Solent by John Cowper Powys (England)
 The Good Companions by J. B. Priestley (England)
Non-fiction
 Good-Bye to All That by Robert Graves (England)
 A Room of One's Own by Virginia Woolf (England)
Genre fiction
 Red Harvest by Dashiell Hammett (US) - the first hard-boiled American detective novel

1930
 Vile Bodies by Evelyn Waugh
 The Apes of God by Wyndham Lewis
 Brief Candles by Aldous Huxley - short stories
 As I Lay Dying by William Faulkner
 Narcissus and Goldmund by Hermann Hesse
 Angel Pavement by J. B. Priestley
 The Virgin and the Gypsy and Love Among the Haystacks by D. H. Lawrence - short stories
Genre fiction
 Last and First Men by Olaf Stapledon (England)
 The Maltese Falcon by Dashiell Hammett (US)
Poetry
 Whoroscope by Samuel Beckett (Ireland, France)
Plays
 Private Lives by Noël Coward
Non-fiction
 Memoirs of a Fox-Hunting Man by Siegfried Sassoon (England) - 2 volumes, 1st in 1929

1931
 The Good Earth by Pearl S. Buck
 The Waves by Virginia Woolf
 Night Flight by Antoine de Saint-Exupéry (France)
Genre fiction
 The Glass Key by Dashiell Hammett
 At the Mountains of Madness by H. P. Lovecraft
Plays
 Mourning Becomes Electra by Eugene O'Neill
 Cavalcade by Noël Coward
Non-fiction
 Axel's Castle by Edmund Wilson (US)
 Music at Night by Aldous Huxley

1932
 The Return of Philip Latinowicz by Miroslav Krleža
 Journey to the End of Night by Louis-Ferdinand Céline (France)
 Brave New World by Aldous Huxley (England)
 The Memorial by Christopher Isherwood (England)
 Laughter in the Dark by Vladimir Nabokov (Russia, France)
 Light in August by William Faulkner
 A Glastonbury Romance by John Cowper Powys
 Stamboul Train by Graham Greene (England)
 Black Mischief by Evelyn Waugh
 Radetzky March by Joseph Roth (Austria)
 Jew Boy by Simon Blumenfeld (England)
Poetry
 The Orators by W. H. Auden (England)

1933
 Man's Fate by André Malraux (France)
 Love on the Dole by Walter Greenwood (England)
 Miss Lonelyhearts by Nathanael West (US)
 The Autobiography of Alice B. Toklas by Gertrude Stein
Genre fiction
 Lost Horizon by James Hilton (England)
 Murder Must Advertise by Dorothy L. Sayers (England)
Non-fiction
 Down and Out in Paris and London by George Orwell (England)
 Texts and Pretexts by Aldous Huxley
 In Praise of Shadows by Jun'ichirō Tanizaki

1934
 Tropic of Cancer by Henry Miller (US) - a groundbreaking obscenity case before the U.S. Supreme Court in 1961  allowed its publication there
 Call It Sleep by Henry Roth (Austria, US)
 Tender Is the Night by F. Scott Fitzgerald
 Threepenny Novel by Bertolt Brecht (Germany)
 Despair by Vladimir Nabokov
 It's a Battlefield by Graham Greene
 A Handful of Dust by Evelyn Waugh
 20,000 Streets Under the Sky by Patrick Hamilton (England)
 Voyage in the Dark by Jean Rhys (Dominica, France, England)
 Appointment in Samarra by John O'Hara (US)
 A Scots Quair by Lewis Grassic Gibbon (Scotland) - trilogy, first volume published in 1932
Genre fiction
 The Postman Always Rings Twice by James M. Cain (US)
 Novel with Cocaine aka Cocain Romance by M. Ageyev (Russia)
Poetry
 18 Poems by Dylan Thomas (Wales)
Non-fiction
 Burmese Days by George Orwell
 Death in the Afternoon by Ernest Hemingway

1935
 Mr Norris Changes Trains by Christopher Isherwood
 Eyeless in Gaza by Aldous Huxley
 Auto-da-Fe by Elias Canetti (Bulgaria, Germany)
 A Clergyman's Daughter by George Orwell
 England Made Me by Graham Greene
 A House in Paris by Elizabeth Bowen (Ireland)
 Tortilla Flat by John Steinbeck (US)
 Studs Lonigan by James T. Farrell (US) - trilogy, first volume published in 1932
Genre fiction
 Little House on the Prairie by Laura Ingalls Wilder (US)
Poetry
 Collected Poems by Cecil Day-Lewis (Northern Ireland)
Plays
 Waiting for Lefty by Clifford Odets (US)

1936
 Death on the Installment Plan by Louis-Ferdinand Céline
 Black Spring by Henry Miller
 U.S.A. by John Dos Passos
 Mephisto by Klaus Mann (Germany, US)
 Absalom, Absalom! by William Faulkner
 Keep the Aspidistra Flying by George Orwell
 Confession of a Murderer by Joseph Roth
 Invitation to a Beheading by Vladimir Nabokov
 The Wessex Novels by John Cowper Powys (England) - tetralogy, 1st vol published in 1927
 Godaan by Premchand
Poetry
 Ballads of Petrica Kerempuh by Miroslav Krleža
Genre fiction
 Jamaica Inn by Daphne du Maurier (England)
 Gone with the Wind by Margaret Mitchell (US)
 A Gun for Sale by Graham Greene

1937
 To Have and Have Not by Ernest Hemingway
 The Years by Virginia Woolf
 Of Mice and Men by John Steinbeck
 Lions and Shadows by Christopher Isherwood
 The Black Book by Lawrence Durrell (UK, Egypt)
 Ferdydurke by Witold Gombrowicz (Poland)
 Revenge for Love by Wyndham Lewis
 White Mule by William Carlos Williams
 Wide Boys Never Work by Robert Westerby (England, US)
Genre fiction
 Star Maker by Olaf Stapledon
 Night and the City by Gerald Kersh (England, US)
 The Face on the Cutting-Room Floor by Cameron McCabe (Ernest Bornemann) (Germany, England)
 The Hobbit by J. R. R. Tolkien (England)
Non-fiction
 The Road to Wigan Pier by George Orwell
 How Green Was My Valley by Richard Llewellyn (Wales)

1938
 Nausea by Jean-Paul Sartre (France)
 Murphy by Samuel Beckett
 Tropic of Capricorn by Henry Miller
 Man's Hope by André Malraux
 The Death of the Heart by Elizabeth Bowen
 Brighton Rock by Graham Greene
 Scoop by Evelyn Waugh
 The Gift by Vladimir Nabokov
Genre fiction
 Brighton Rock by Graham Greene
 Rebecca by Daphne du Maurier
Non-fiction
 Journey to a War by W. H. Auden and Christopher Isherwood
 Homage to Catalonia by George Orwell
 Enemies of Promise by Cyril Connolly (England)

1939
 The Grapes of Wrath by John Steinbeck
 Finnegans Wake by James Joyce
 The Banquet in Blitva by Miroslav Krleža
 At Swim-Two-Birds by Flann O'Brien (Ireland)
 Goodbye to Berlin by Christopher Isherwood
 After Many a Summer by Aldous Huxley
 Coming Up for Air by George Orwell
 On the Marble Cliffs by Ernst Jünger
 Good Morning, Midnight by Jean Rhys
 The Day of the Locust by Nathanael West
 The Legend of the Holy Drinker by Joseph Roth
 Lotte in Weimar by Thomas Mann
 The Confidential Agent by Graham Greene
 Mister Johnson by Joyce Cary (Ireland)
 Wind, Sand and Stars by Antoine de Saint-Exupéry
 Pal Joey by John O'Hara
Genre fiction
 The Big Sleep by Raymond Chandler (US)
 Rogue Male by Geoffrey Household (England)
 The Mask of Dimitrios by Eric Ambler
 And Then There Were None by Agatha Christie
Poetry
 Autumn Journal by Louis MacNeice (N Ireland)
 The Map of Love by Dylan Thomas
Plays
 This Happy Breed by Noël Coward

World War II

1940
 Native Son by Richard Wright (US, France)
 Darkness at Noon by Arthur Koestler (Hungary, England)
 The Master and Margarita by Mikhail Bulgakov - published in English 1966
 For Whom the Bell Tolls by Ernest Hemingway
 The Power and the Glory by Graham Greene
 The Heart Is a Lonely Hunter by Carson McCullers (US)
 Portrait of the Artist as a Young Dog by Dylan Thomas
 Owen Glendower by John Cowper Powys
 You Can't Go Home Again by Thomas Wolfe
 And Quiet Flows the Don by Mikhail Sholokhov (Russia) - two volumes, first published in 1934
The feeling of the world by Carlos Drummond de Andrade (Brazil)

Genre fiction
 Journey into Fear by Eric Ambler (England)
 Farewell, My Lovely by Raymond Chandler
Plays
 The Iceman Cometh by Eugene O'Neill
Non-fiction
 To the Finland Station by Edmund Wilson

1941
 Hangover Square by Patrick Hamilton
 Reflections in a Golden Eye by Carson McCullers
 The Third Policeman by Flann O'Brien
Genre fiction
 Mildred Pierce by James M. Cain
Non-fiction
 Grey Eminence by Aldous Huxley

1942
 The Stranger by Albert Camus (Algeria, France)
 Our Lady of the Flowers by Jean Genet (France)
 Flight to Arras by Antoine de Saint-Exupéry
Plays
 The Flies by Jean-Paul Sartre

1943
 Arrival and Departure by Arthur Koestler
 The Ministry of Fear by Graham Greene
 The Man Without Qualities by Robert Musil (Austria) - trilogy, first volume published 1930
Genre fiction
 Double Indemnity by James M. Cain
 The Little Prince by Antoine de Saint-Exupéry (France)
Poetry
 Selected Poems by Keith Douglas (England)
Non-fiction
 Being and Nothingness by Jean-Paul Sartre
 The Myth of Sisyphus by Albert Camus

1944
 The Horse's Mouth by Joyce Cary
 Ficciones by Jorge Luis Borges (Argentina) - short stories
 The Razor's Edge by Somerset Maugham
 Time Must Have a Stop by Aldous Huxley
Plays
 The Glass Menagerie by Tennessee Williams (US)

1945
 Black Boy by Richard Wright (author)
 Animal Farm by George Orwell
 Watt by Samuel Beckett - published in 1953
 Brideshead Revisited by Evelyn Waugh
 Black Boy by Richard Wright
 Lark Rise to Candleford by Flora Thompson (England) - trilogy, first volume in 1939
Genre fiction
 If He Hollers Let Him Go by Chester Himes (US, France)
 The Space Trilogy by C. S. Lewis (N Ireland) - first volume published in 1938

1946
 Cry, the Beloved Country by Alan Paton (South Africa)
 The Miracle of the Rose by Jean Genet
 El Señor Presidente by Miguel Ángel Asturias (Guatemala)
 Froth on the Daydream by Boris Vian (France)
 The Member of the Wedding by Carson McCullers
Poetry
 Deaths and Entrances by Dylan Thomas
Plays
 The Winslow Boy by Terence Rattigan (England)
Non-fiction
 Alamein to Zem Zem by Keith Douglas
 Memoirs of Hecate County by Edmund Wilson
 This Way for the Gas, Ladies and Gentlemen by Tadeusz Borowski (Poland)

1947
 The Plague by Albert Camus
 Under the Volcano by Malcolm Lowry (England, Canada)
 Bend Sinister by Vladimir Nabokov
 The Victim by Saul Bellow (Canada, US)
 The Conformist by Alberto Moravia (Italy)
 The Middle of the Journey by Lionel Trilling (US)
 Slaves of Solitude by Patrick Hamilton
 Of Love and Hunger by Julian MacLaren-Ross (England)
 Funeral Rites by Jean Genet
 Snow Country by Yasunari Kawabata
Plays
 A Streetcar Named Desire by Tennessee Williams
Non-fiction
 The Diary of a Young Girl by Anne Frank (Netherlands)

1948
 The Naked and the Dead by Norman Mailer (US)
 Confessions of a Mask by 'Yukio Mishima' (Japan)
 The Heart of the Matter by Graham Greene
 El Túnel by Ernesto Sabato (Argentina)
 The City and the Pillar by Gore Vidal (US)
 Ape and Essence by Aldous Huxley
 Ashes and Diamonds by Jerzy Andrzejewski (Poland)
 Querelle of Brest by Jean Genet
Genre fiction
 No Orchids for Miss Blandish by James Hadley Chase (England)
Plays
 The Browning Version by Terence Rattigan
Non-fiction
 The Second Sex by Simone de Beauvoir (France — early feminist study)
 The Kon-Tiki Expedition by Thor Heyerdahl (Norway)

1949
 Nineteen Eighty-Four by George Orwell
 The Roads to Freedom by Jean-Paul Sartre - trilogy, first volume published 1945
 The Thief's Journal by Jean Genet
 The Man with the Golden Arm by Nelson Algren (US)
 The Train Was on Time by Heinrich Böll (Germany)
 The Aleph by Jorge Luis Borges
 The Kingdom of this World by Alejo Carpentier (Mexico)
 The Heat of the Day by Elizabeth Bowen
Genre fiction
 The Trouble with Harry by Jack Trevor Story (England)
 The Mating Season by P. G. Wodehouse
Plays
 Death of a Salesman by Arthur Miller (US)

Postwar period

The intermediate postwar period separating "Modernism" from "Postmodernism" (1950s literature) is the floruit of the beat generation and the classical science fiction of  Isaac Asimov, Arthur C. Clarke and Robert A. Heinlein. This period also saw the publication of Samuel Beckett's trilogy of novels, Molloy, Malone Dies, and The Unnameable, which enacted the dissolution of the self-identical human subject and inspired later novelists such as Thomas Bernhard, John Banville, and David Markson.

1950
 Scenes from Provincial Life by William Cooper (England) - the first of the British 1950s 'kitchen sink' novels
 Canto General by Pablo Neruda
Plays
 The Bald Soprano by Eugène Ionesco (Romania, France)
Genre fiction
 A Town Like Alice by Nevil Shute (England, Australia)
 Strangers On a Train by Patricia Highsmith (US)
Non-fiction
 The Authoritarian Personality by Theodor Adorno (Germany, US)

1951
 Molloy by Samuel Beckett (Ireland, France)
 Malone Dies by Samuel Beckett (Ireland, France)
 The Catcher in the Rye by J. D. Salinger (US)
 The Hive by Camilo José Cela (Spain)
 Porius (A Romance of the Dark Ages) by John Cowper Powys (England)
 The Grass Harp by Truman Capote (US)
 Memoirs of Hadrian by Marguerite Yourcenar (France)
 The Opposing Shore by Julien Gracq (France)
Plays
 The Lesson by Eugène Ionesco (Romania, France)
Non-fiction
 The Rebel by Albert Camus (France)

1952
 Invisible Man by Ralph Ellison (US)
 Wise Blood by Flannery O'Connor (US)
 Go by John Clellon Holmes (US) - the first Beat novel
 The Natural by Bernard Malamud (US)
 The Old Man and the Sea by Ernest Hemingway
 East of Eden by John Steinbeck
Genre fiction
 The Tiger in the Smoke by Margery Allingham (England)
 The Killer Inside Me by Jim Thompson (US)
Plays
 The Chairs by Eugène Ionesco (Romania, France)

1953
 The Unnameable by Samuel Beckett (Ireland, France)
 Junkie and Queer by William S. Burroughs (US)
 Go Tell It On the Mountain by James Baldwin (US, France)
 The Outsider by Richard Wright
 The Adventures of Augie March by Saul Bellow
 The Captive Mind by Czesław Miłosz (Poland)
 Hurry on Down by John Wain (England) - the first 'angry young man' novel
Genre fiction
 Casino Royale by Ian Fleming (England, Jamaica) -  first James Bond novel
 The Long Goodbye by Raymond Chandler
 Childhood's End by Arthur C. Clarke (England, Sri Lanka)
 Foundation by Isaac Asimov (US) - trilogy, first volume published in 1951
 Prelude to a Certain Midnight by Gerald Kersh
Plays
 Waiting for Godot by Samuel Beckett

1954
 Lord of the Flies by William Golding (England)
 Lucky Jim by Kingsley Amis (England) - the most famous 'angry young man' novel
 Under the Net by Iris Murdoch (England)
 Bonjour Tristesse by Françoise Sagan (France)
Genre fiction
 Fahrenheit 451 by Ray Bradbury (US)
 Story of O by Pauline Réage (France)
Plays
 Under Milk Wood by Dylan Thomas
 The Quare Fellow by Brendan Behan (Ireland)
Non-fiction
 The Doors of Perception by Aldous Huxley

1955
 Lolita by Vladimir Nabokov
 One by David Karp (US)
 The Quiet American by Graham Greene
 The Bread of Those Early Years by Heinrich Böll
 The Tree of Man by Patrick White (Australia)
 The Inheritors by William Golding
 Pedro Páramo by Juan Rulfo (Mexico)
 The Voyeur by Alain Robbe-Grillet (France)
 The Genius and the Goddess by Aldous Huxley
 The Deer Park by Norman Mailer
 The Recognitions by William Gaddis (US)
 Memed, My Hawk by Yaşar Kemal (Turkey)
Genre fiction
 The Lord of the Rings by J. R. R. Tolkien, first volume in 1954
 The Talented Mr. Ripley by Patricia Highsmith
Plays
 Cat on a Hot Tin Roof by Tennessee Williams
 Bus Stop by William Inge (US)
Poetry
 The Less Deceived by Philip Larkin (England)

1956
 The Fall by Albert Camus
The Devil to Pay in the Backlands by João Guimarães Rosa
 Giovanni's Room by James Baldwin
 The Lonely Londoners by Samuel Selvon (Trinidad, England)
 A Walk on the Wild Side by Nelson Algren
Genre fiction
 The Chronicles of Narnia by C. S. Lewis (N Ireland) - seven volumes, first in 1950
 Peyton Place by Grace Metalious
 The Hundred and One Dalmatians by Dodie Smith (England)
Plays
 Look Back In Anger by John Osborne (England) - the first 'angry young man' play
Poetry
 Howl and Other Poems by Allen Ginsberg (US)
Non-fiction
 Heaven and Hell by Aldous Huxley

1957
 On the Road by Jack Kerouac (Canada, US)
 Young Adam by Alexander Trocchi (Scotland)
 Room at the Top by John Braine (England)
 Doctor Zhivago by Boris Pasternak (Russia)
 Voss by Patrick White
 The Assistant by Bernard Malamud
 Second Thoughts by Michel Butor (France)
 Pnin by Vladimir Nabokov
 Cairo Trilogy by Naguib Mahfouz (Egypt)
 Gimpel the Fool by Isaac Bashevis Singer (Poland, US) - short stories, originally published in Yiddish years earlier
 Atlas Shrugged by Ayn Rand (US)
Genre fiction
 On the Beach by Nevil Shute
Plays
 The Room and The Birthday Party by Harold Pinter (England)
 Endgame by Samuel Beckett
 The Entertainer by John Osborne
 Orpheus Descending by Tennessee Williams
 The Visit by Friedrich Dürrenmatt (Switzerland)
Poetry
 Calling Out to Yeti by Wisława Szymborska (Poland)

1958
 If This Is a Man by Primo Levi (Italy)
 Breakfast At Tiffany's by Truman Capote
 The Dharma Bums by Jack Kerouac
 Saturday Night and Sunday Morning by Alan Sillitoe (England)
 A Taste of Honey by Shelagh Delaney (England)
 Things Fall Apart by Chinua Achebe (Nigeria)
 The Bell by Iris Murdoch
 Fowlers End by Gerald Kersh
 Our Man in Havana by Graham Greene
 Candy by Terry Southern (US)
Genre fiction
 Exodus by Leon Uris (US)
 Zimiamvian Trilogy by E. R. Eddison (England) - first volume in 1935
 Molesworth by Geoffrey Willans (England) and Ronald Searle (England, France) - tetralogy, first book in 1954
Plays
 Krapp's Last Tape by Samuel Beckett
 Suddenly, Last Summer by Tennessee Williams
Non-fiction
 The Theatre and Its Double by Antonin Artaud (France)
 Borstal Boy by Brendan Behan

1959
 A Raisin in the Sun by Lorraine Hansberry (United States of America)
 The Tin Drum by Günter Grass (Germany)
 Naked Lunch by William S. Burroughs
 The Last of the Just by André Schwarz-Bart (France)
 Goodbye, Columbus by Philip Roth (US)
 Zazie in the Metro by Raymond Queneau (France)
 In the Labyrinth by Alain Robbe-Grillet
 The Loneliness of the Long Distance Runner by Alan Sillitoe
 Billy Liar by Keith Waterhouse (England)
 The Long Day Wanes by Anthony Burgess (England) - trilogy, first volume published in 1956
 The Magic Christian by Terry Southern
Genre fiction
 The Gormenghast Trilogy by Mervyn Peake (England) - first volume in 1946
 The Getaway by Jim Thompson
Plays
 The Dumb Waiter and The Caretaker by Harold Pinter
 Rhinoceros by Eugène Ionesco

Cold War period 1960–1989

1960
 To Kill a Mockingbird by Harper Lee (US)
 The London Trilogy by Colin MacInnes (England) - first volume, Absolute Beginners, published in 1957
 Cain's Book by Alexander Trocchi (UK, France, US)
 This Sporting Life by David Storey (UK)
 A Burnt-Out Case by Graham Greene
 Hiroshima Mon Amour by Marguerite Duras (France)
 The Ballad of Peckham Rye by Muriel Spark (Scotland)
 The Rosy Crucifixion by Henry Miller (US) - trilogy, first volume published 1949
 The Sot-Weed Factor by John Barth (US)
 The Magician of Lublin by Isaac Bashevis Singer 
Non-fiction and Quasi-fiction
 The Morning of the Magicians by Louis Pauwels and Jacques Bergier (France) - the 1960s obsession with the occult starts here. Published in English 1963
 A Canticle for Leibowitz by Walter M. Miller Jr. (US)

1961
 Catch-22 by Joseph Heller (US)
 A House for Mr Biswas by V. S. Naipaul (Trinidad, England)
 Riders in the Chariot by Patrick White
 The Prime of Miss Jean Brodie by Muriel Spark
 A Severed Head by Iris Murdoch
 Sword of Honour by Evelyn Waugh - trilogy, first volume published in 1952
 Revolutionary Road by Richard Yates (US)
 Hear Us O Lord from Heaven Thy Dwelling Place by Malcolm Lowry - posthumous
Genre fiction
 Solaris by Stanisław Lem (Poland)
 Stranger in a Strange Land by Robert A. Heinlein (US)
 The Man in the High Castle by Philip K. Dick (US)

1962
 One Day in the Life of Ivan Denisovich by Aleksandr Solzhenitsyn (Russia)
 A Clockwork Orange and The Wanting Seed by Anthony Burgess (England)
 Pale Fire by Vladimir Nabokov
 Island by Aldous Huxley
 The Time of the Hero by Mario Vargas Llosa (Peru)
 The Golden Notebook by Doris Lessing (Zimbabwe, England)
 The Death of Artemio Cruz by Carlos Fuentes (Mexico)
 The Alexandria Quartet by Lawrence Durrell - first volume published 1957
 Big Sur by Jack Kerouac - the last of the Lost Generation at the end of the Beat Generation
Genre fiction
 The IPCRESS File by Len Deighton (England) - first of the Harry Palmer novels
Non-fiction
 Silent Spring by Rachel Carson (US) - the first major popular study on the deterioration of the environment

1963
 V. by Thomas Pynchon (US)
 The Bell Jar by Sylvia Plath (US, England)
 Hopscotch by Julio Cortázar (Argentina)
 One Flew Over the Cuckoo's Nest by Ken Kesey (US)
 The Collector by John Fowles (England)
 The Lowlife by Alexander Baron (England)
 Cat's Cradle by Kurt Vonnegut (US)
Genre fiction
 Planet of the Apes by Pierre Boulle (France)
 The Spy Who Came in from the Cold by John le Carré (England)
 The Grifters by Jim Thompson
Non-fiction
 The Truce by Primo Levi

1964
 Herzog by Saul Bellow
 A Single Man by Christopher Isherwood
 Last Exit to Brooklyn by Hubert Selby (US)
 The Spire by William Golding (England)
 Nothing Like the Sun by Anthony Burgess
Genre fiction
 Charlie and the Chocolate Factory by Roald Dahl (UK)
 The Three Stigmata of Palmer Eldritch by Philip K. Dick (US)
 Little Big Man by Thomas Berger (US)
Non-fiction
 Understanding Media by Marshall McLuhan (Canada)

1965
 The Magus by John Fowles
 The Interpreters by Wole Soyinka (Nigeria)
 Cosmicomics by Italo Calvino (Italy)
 The Painted Bird by Jerzy Kosinski (Poland, US)
 Here We Go Round the Mulberry Bush by Hunter Davies (England) - the kitchen sink novel mutates into the swinging 1960s novel
Genre fiction
 The Cyberiad by Stanisław Lem
Plays
 Marat/Sade by Peter Weiss (Germany, Sweden)
 Tango by Sławomir Mrożek (Poland)
Poetry
 Briggflatts by Basil Bunting
Non-fiction and Quasi-fiction
 The Kandy-Kolored Tangerine-Flake Streamline Baby by Tom Wolfe (US)
 The Autobiography of Malcolm X by Alex Haley (US)

1966
 A Man of the People by Chinua Achebe (Nigeria)
 Alfie by Bill Naughton (England)
 The Comedians by Graham Greene
 Wide Sargasso Sea by Jean Rhys
 Tremor of Intent by Anthony Burgess
Genre fiction
 Pavane by Keith Roberts (England)
 The Anti-Death League by Kingsley Amis
Non-fiction and Quasi-fiction
 In Cold Blood by Truman Capote
 Hell's Angels: The Strange and Terrible Saga of the Outlaw Motorcycle Gangs by Hunter S. Thompson (US)
 Been Down So Long It Looks Like Up to Me by Richard Fariña (US)

1967
 One Hundred Years of Solitude by Gabriel García Márquez (Colombia)
 The Crying of Lot 49 by Thomas Pynchon
 The Vendor of Sweets by R. K. Narayan (India)
 Poor Cow by Nell Dunn (England)
 A Grain of Wheat by Ngũgĩ wa Thiong'o
Non-fiction
 In the First Circle by Aleksandr Solzhenitsyn
 The Medium is the Message by Marshall McLuhan and Quentin Fiore

1968
 Cocksure by Mordecai Richler (Canada)
 Couples by John Updike (US)
 The Public Image by Muriel Spark
 Lunar Caustic by Malcolm Lowry - posthumous
 The Abyss by Marguerite Yourcenar
Non-fiction and quasi-fiction
 Cancer Ward by Aleksandr Solzhenitsyn
 The Electric Kool-Aid Acid Test by Tom Wolfe
 The Armies of the Night and Miami and the Siege of Chicago by Norman Mailer
 Bomb Culture by Jeff Nuttall (England)
 Slouching Towards Bethlehem by Joan Didion (US)
 The Teachings of Don Juan by Carlos Castaneda (US)

1969
 Portnoy's Complaint by Philip Roth
 The French Lieutenant's Woman by John Fowles
 A Void by Georges Perec (France)
 Passacaille by Robert Pinget (France)
 Dark as the Grave wherein my Friend is Laid by Malcolm Lowry - posthumous
Genre fiction
 Barefoot in the Head by Brian Aldiss
 The Final Programme by Michael Moorcock (England, US)
 Slaughterhouse-Five by Kurt Vonnegut (US)
 The Godfather by Mario Puzo (US)
Non-fiction and Quasi-fiction
 Papillon by Henri Charrière (France)
 The View Over Atlantis by John Michell (England)

1970
 Play It as It Lays by Joan Didion
 Mr. Sammler's Planet by Saul Bellow
 Being There by Jerzy Kosiński
 October Ferry to Gabriola by Malcolm Lowry - posthumous
Genre fiction
 The Hot Rock by Donald E. Westlake (US)
 Deliverance by James Dickey (US)
Non-fiction and Quasi-fiction
 The Female Eunuch by Germaine Greer (Australia, England)
 Groupie by Jenny Fabian (England)
 Playpower by Richard Neville (Australia, England)
 Revolt into Style by George Melly (England)
 Soledad Brother by George Jackson (US) - prison letters
 Soul on Ice by Eldridge Cleaver (US)

1971
 In a Free State by V. S. Naipaul (Trinidad, England)
 M/F by Anthony Burgess
 Our Gang by Philip Roth
 The Dice Man by Luke Rhinehart (US)
 Another Roadside Attraction by Tom Robbins (US)
Genre fiction
 The Day of the Jackal by Frederick Forsyth (England)
Non-fiction and Quasi-fiction
 The Happy Hooker by Xaviera Hollander (Indonesia, Netherlands)
 Fear and Loathing in Las Vegas by Hunter S. Thompson

1972
 The Infernal Desire Machines of Doctor Hoffman by Angela Carter (England)
 Invisible Cities by Italo Calvino
 G by John Berger (England, France)
 The Good for Nothing by Oğuz Atay (Turkey)
Genre fiction
 The Friends of Eddie Coyle by George V. Higgins (US)
 Jonathan Livingston Seagull by Richard Bach (US)
 The Odessa File by Frederick Forsyth
Poetry
 Crossing the Water and Winter Trees by Sylvia Plath

1973
 Gravity's Rainbow by Thomas Pynchon
 Crash by J. G. Ballard (England)
 Season of Anomy by Wole Soyinka (Nigeria)
 Life Is Elsewhere by Milan Kundera (Czechoslovakia, France)
 Sweet Dreams by Michael Frayn (England)
 Fear of Flying by Erica Jong (US)
 The Great American Novel by Philip Roth
Genre fiction
 Frankenstein Unbound by Brian Aldiss

1974
 If Beale Street Could Talk by James Baldwin (US)
 The Conservationist by Nadine Gordimer (South Africa)
 The Fan Man by William Kotzwinkle (US)
 The Lost Honour of Katharina Blum by Heinrich Böll
 I, the Supreme by Augusto Roa Bastos (Paraguay)
 Napoleon Symphony by Anthony Burgess
 Myra Breckinridge and Myron by Gore Vidal - first of pair published in 1968
Genre fiction
 Tinker Tailor Soldier Spy by John le Carré
 Fletch by Gregory Mcdonald (US)
Genre fiction
 Jaws by Peter Benchley (US)
Non-fiction and Quasi-fiction
 All the President's Men by Bob Woodward and Carl Bernstein (US)
Poetry
 Mr. Cogito by Zbigniew Herbert (Poland)

1975
 Humboldt's Gift by Saul Bellow
 The Deptford Trilogy by Robertson Davies - first volume published 1970
 Dead Babies by Martin Amis (England)
 The Autumn of the Patriarch by Gabriel García Márquez
 The History Man by Malcolm Bradbury (England)
 The Periodic Table by Primo Levi - short stories
Genre fiction
 Watership Down by Richard Adams (England)
 The Choirboys by Joseph Wambaugh (US)
 Shōgun by James Clavell (England, US)
 'Salem's Lot by Stephen King (US)

1976
 Ragtime by EL Doctorow (US)
Genre fiction
 Interview with the Vampire by Anne Rice (US)
Non-fiction and quasi-fiction
 Roots by Alex Haley
Another Day of Life by Ryszard Kapuściński (Poland)
Drama
 Death and the King's Horseman by Wole Soyinka

1977
 The Engineer of Human Souls by Josef Škvorecký (Czechoslovakia)
 Song of Solomon by Toni Morrison (US)

1978
 Success by Martin Amis
 The Sea, the Sea by Iris Murdoch
 Lanark: A Life in Four Books by Alasdair Gray (Scotland)
 Life A User's Manual by Georges Perec
 The Book of Laughter and Forgetting by Milan Kundera
 Jake's Thing by Kingsley Amis
 The World According to Garp by John Irving (US)
 1985 by Anthony Burgess
 Horatio Stubbs by Brian Aldiss - trilogy, first volume published in 1970
Non-fiction and Quasi-fiction
The Emperor by Ryszard Kapuściński 
Genre fiction
 Rumpole of the Bailey by John Mortimer (England)

1979
 A Bend in the River by V. S. Naipaul
 The Unlimited Dream Company by J. G. Ballard
 Sophie's Choice by William Styron (US)
Non-fiction and Quasi-fiction
 The White Album by Joan Didion
 The Right Stuff by Tom Wolfe (US)

1980
 The Name of the Rose by Umberto Eco
 Pascali's Island by Barry Unsworth (England)
 Earthly Powers by Anthony Burgess

1981
 Midnight's Children by Salman Rushdie (India, UK)
 The Comfort of Strangers by Ian McEwan (England)
 The White Hotel by D. M. Thomas (England)
 Chronicle of a Death Foretold by Gabriel García Márquez
 What We Talk About When We Talk About Love by Raymond Carver (US) - short stories
Genre fiction
 The Red Dragon by Thomas Harris (US)
 Gorky Park by Martin Cruz Smith (England, Russia)
Non-fiction
 Conversations with an Executioner by Kazimierz Moczarski (Poland)

1982
 Schindler's Ark by Thomas Keneally (Australia)
 An Ice-Cream War by William Boyd (Ghana, Scotland)
 The Color Purple by Alice Walker (US)
 A Wild Sheep Chase by Haruki Murakami
Genre fiction
 Prizzi's Honor by Richard Condon
 Limes Inferior by Janusz A. Zajdel (Poland)

1983
 Waterland by Graham Swift (England)
 Shame by Salman Rushdie
 Erev by Eli Schechtman (USSR, Israel) 
Genre fiction
 The Colour of Magic by Terry Pratchett (England) - first book of the Discworld series

1984
 Money by Martin Amis
 Bright Lights, Big City by Jay McInerney (US)
 The Unbearable Lightness of Being by Milan Kundera
 Flaubert's Parrot by Julian Barnes (England)
 Nights at the Circus by Angela Carter
 Enderby by Anthony Burgess - tetralogy, first volume published in 1963
 The Witches of Eastwick by John Updike
Non-fiction
 Empire of the Sun by J. G. Ballard

1985
 White Noise by Don DeLillo (US)
 Less than Zero by Bret Easton Ellis (US)
 Oranges Are Not the Only Fruit by Jeanette Winterson (England)
 The Accidental Tourist by Anne Tyler (US)
 Hawksmoor by Peter Ackroyd (England)
 Illywhacker by Peter Carey (Australia)
 The Kingdom of the Wicked by Anthony Burgess
Genre fiction
 L.A. Quartet by James Ellroy (US) - tetralogy, first volume published 1984
 The Handmaid's Tale by Margaret Atwood - (US)

1986
 Slaves of New York by Tama Janowitz (US)
 The Old Devils by Kingsley Amis
 An Artist of the Floating World by Kazuo Ishiguro (Japan, UK)
Non-fiction
 Decolonising the Mind: The Politics of Language in African Literature by Ngũgĩ wa Thiong'o

1987
 The Satanic Verses by Salman Rushdie
 The Bonfire of the Vanities by Tom Wolfe
 Anthills of the Savannah by Chinua Achebe
 The Alchemist by Paulo Coelho  (Brasil) 
Genre fiction
 Presumed Innocent by Scott Turow (US)

1988
 Mother London by Michael Moorcock
 Libra by Don DeLillo
 Oscar and Lucinda by Peter Carey (Australia)
 Love in the Time of Cholera by Gabriel García Márquez
Genre fiction
 Sprawl by William Gibson (Canada, US) - trilogy, first volume published 1984

1989
 London Fields by Martin Amis
 Foucault's Pendulum by Umberto Eco
 The Remains of the Day by Kazuo Ishiguro
 To the Ends of the Earth by William Golding - trilogy, first volume published 1980
 The Book of Evidence by John Banville (Ireland)
 The Trick of It by Michael Frayn

1990s

The English Patient by Michael Ondaatje
Slam poetry

1990
 The New York Trilogy by Paul Auster (US) - first volume published 1985
 The Black Book by Orhan Pamuk (Turkey)
 Restoration by Rose Tremain (England)
 Possession by A. S. Byatt (England)
 The Buddha of Suburbia by Hanif Kureishi (England)
 Dirty Weekend by Helen Zahavi (England)
Genre fiction
 Devil in a Blue Dress by Walter Mosley (US)
 Good Omens by Neil Gaiman and Terry Pratchett

1991
 Generation X: Tales for an Accelerated Culture by Douglas Coupland (Canada)

1994
 Blood of Elves by Andrzej Sapkowski (Poland)
1996
 Infinite Jest by David Foster Wallace (US)

1997
 Underworld by Don DeLillo (US)
 American Pastoral by Philip Roth
 Nightmare by Zlatko Topčić
 Into Thin Air by Jon Krakauer
Genre fiction
 Northern Lights by Philip Pullman (UK) - first in His Dark Materials trilogy
 Harry Potter and the Sorcerer's Stone by J. K. Rowling (UK) - first in series

See also 

 American literature
 Experimental literature
 French literature of the 20th century
 List of 20th-century writers
 Literary modernism
 Twentieth-century English literature
 20th-century music
 20th century in poetry

References

External links

 Discovering Literature: 20th century at the British Library